Count Ivan Andreyevich Osterman (1725–1811) was a Russian statesman and the son of Andrei Osterman.

After Osterman's father fell into disgrace, Ivan Osterman was transferred from the Imperial Guards to the regular army and then sent abroad, where he continued his education. In 1757, Osterman was in the Russian service again. He held diplomatic posts in Paris and Stockholm, where he would exercise considerable influence on Gustav III of Sweden. In 1774, Osterman was appointed a member of the Governing Senate.

In 1783, Osterman was appointed Minister of foreign affairs of Imperial Russia, but would play only a secondary role in this post. His closest associates - Count Bezborodko, Prince Zubov, Fyodor Rostopchin - were the ones with real power, but they lacked the fluency in languages and oleaginous manner of address which Osterman was famed for.

In 1796, Osterman was appointed the Chancellor of the Russian Empire, again as a puppet of real policy-makers. A year later, the new Emperor Paul dismissed him from office. Ivan Osterman spent the last years of his life in Moscow. As he had no children of his own, his title and last name were inherited by a nephew, the celebrated General Tolstoy.

References

External links
Ostermanniana (website about Ostermann). (In Russian).

1725 births
1811 deaths
Russian nobility
Foreign ministers of the Russian Empire
Chancellors of the Russian Empire
People from the Russian Empire of German descent
18th-century people from the Russian Empire
18th-century diplomats of the Russian Empire
18th-century military personnel from the Russian Empire